Tenafly is a former railroad station located in Tenafly, Bergen County, New Jersey, United States. The station was a stop along Erie Railroad's suburban Northern Branch (NRRNJ) which terminated at Pavonia Terminal on the Hudson River. It stopped being used for passenger rail transport in 1966, by which time trains had been redirected to Hoboken Terminal. The rail line is still used for freight transport by CSX.

The Northern Branch Corridor Project is a proposed New Jersey Transit project to extend the Hudson–Bergen Light Rail along the line, restoring service to the landmark and other stations along the route. In a non-binding referendum in January 2011, citizens of Tenafly rejected the idea of the town being the northern terminus of the project. Completed in 1874, the station was added to the National Register of Historic Places on January 25, 1979, for its significance in architecture, commerce, social history, and transportation. It was designed by Daniel Topping Atwood, an architect from New York City.

The station building currently houses a restaurant.

See also 
National Register of Historic Places listings in Bergen County, New Jersey
Englewood station (Erie Railroad)
Demarest station, a NRHP-listed station along the line
Timeline of Jersey City, New Jersey-area railroads
Operating Passenger Railroad Stations Thematic Resource
List of NJ Transit railroad stations

References 

Gothic Revival architecture in New Jersey
Railway stations in the United States opened in 1859
Railway stations in Bergen County, New Jersey
Railway stations on the National Register of Historic Places in New Jersey
Former Erie Railroad stations
Former railway stations in New Jersey
Tenafly, New Jersey
National Register of Historic Places in Bergen County, New Jersey
New Jersey Register of Historic Places
Railway stations closed in 1966
1859 establishments in New Jersey
1966 disestablishments in New Jersey